MG.K vis Colors for Peace VPM is an Italian UCI Continental team founded in 2014. It participates in UCI Continental Circuits races.

Team roster

Major wins
2014
Trofeo Internazionale Bastianelli, Nicola Gaffurini
Stage 3 Giro del Friuli-Venezia Giulia, Gianmarco Di Francesco
2015
Gran Premio Industrie del Marmo, Gianmarco Di Francesco
Giro del Medio Brenta, Michele Gazzara
Trofeo Internazionale Bastianelli, Michele Gazzara
2017
Belgrade Banjaluka II, Nicola Gaffurini
Overall Tour of Albania, Francesco Manuel Bongiorno
Stage 2, Paolo Totò
Stage 4, Francesco Manuel Bongiorno
Coppa della Pace, Nicola Gaffurini
Giro del Medio Brenta, Michele Gazzara
2018
GP Laguna Porec, Paolo Totò
Overall Tour of Albania, Michele Gazzara
Stage 1, Michele Gazzara
Stage 4, Nicola Gaffurini
2019
Stage 3 Giro Ciclistico d'Italia, Fabio Mazzucco
Stage 3a (ITT) Tour of Szeklerland, Paolo Totò
Gran Premio di Poggiana, Fabio Mazzucco
GP Capodarco, Filippo Zana
2022
Stage 2 Tour of Bulgaria, Paul Double

References

External links

UCI Continental Teams (Europe)
Cycling teams based in Italy
Cycling teams established in 2014
2014 establishments in Italy